Hadsund South, originally Sønder Hadsund, is a district in the city of Hadsund, adjoined to the rest of the city by the Hadsund Bridge. It lies 252 meters south of the city proper. Due to the separation from the rest of Hadsund, it is classified as an "independent urban area" by Statistics Denmark. As of 1 January 2022, the area has a population of 441. The area was first recognized in 1436. Today, Hadsund South Station and the Ferry Inn Hotel (Færgekroen) are located in Hadsund South.

History
The first credible mention of Hadsund South in written records appears in 1579 as "Hassond ferresstedtt" after the inn who prepared the ferry site (today Færgekroen). However, other names have also been attributed to the area, such as "Hadsund Husene", dating to at least 1736 and lasting until 1880.

Originally, the ferry inn and local jetty constituted the entire settlement area jetty. However, justification for a tangible population in Hadsund South was only brought by the advent of the railway much later, with boarding access provided by the railway station. This soon spurred industrial development in the area which provided a means of living for the local residents.

External links

 Mariagerfjord municipality's official website) 
 Hadsund Trade association
 a page about Hadsund

References

 Municipal statistics: NetBorger Kommunefakta, delivered from KMD aka Kommunedata (Municipal Data)
 Municipal mergers and neighbors: Eniro new municipalities map
 Hadsund – fra ladested til industriby 1983, s. 4-6

Cities and towns in the North Jutland Region
Former municipalities of Denmark
Mariagerfjord Municipality
Hadsund